Nivedita Basu is an Indian television producer who worked as Creative Director at Balaji Telefilms. Nivedita turned producer in 2015 and owns a celebrity cricket team (Kolkata Baabu Moshayes) on the television reality show Box Cricket League.

Early life
Basu was born in New Delhi. Her father, Prateek Basu was an ex-Army officer and mother Rita Basu is a national-level Table Tennis and handball player. She has an elder sister, Sonali Basu Tyagi.

Career 

Basu joined Balaji Telefilms in 2000. By 2004, she was a deputy creative director, and she became Ekta Kapoor's second, determining the fates of the characters of soaps Kasautii Zindagii Kay and Kyunki Saas Bhi Kabhi Bahu Thi. She also worked on the series Hum Paanch, Kahaani Ghar Ghar Ki, Kavyanjali, Kkusum, Kyaa Hoga Nimmo Kaa, Kutumb, Kasturi Kahiin to Hoga, Karam Apnaa Apnaa, Kasamh Se, Kabhii Sautan Kabhii Saheli, Kohi Apna Sa,   Kesar, Tujh Sang Preet Lagai Sajna, Kaahin Kissii Roz, Kahi To Milenge, Kya Hadsaa Kya Haqeeqat, K. Street Pali Hill, Kis Desh Mein Hai Meraa Dil, Kammal, Khwaish and many others.

Basu quit Balaji in January 2009 as a part of that production house's restructuring efforts. She joined Colosceum Media as vice president for scripted programming.

Basu also worked as a Creative Director on 24, a 24-episode series in Hindi, which is the Indian version of the American TV series of the same name. She then worked as a Creative Director on The Bachelorette India - Mere Khayalon Ki Mallika, the Indian version of the hit series The Bachelorette.

In 2014, Basu established her own production house named House of Originals and has produced few new shows for prime TV channels.

In 2015, Basu had signed Amrita Rao and Deepti Naval for her TV series titled Meri Awaaz Hi Pehchaan Hai. Her production house is working on TV serial named as Ek Vivah Aisa Bhi. In 2018, Basu started an NGO, Pehla Kadam For Girl Child Welfare.

In 2021, Basu appointed as head of content and acquisition of biggbang amusement and in March 2022 She joined Atrangii - Dekhte Raho Hindi GEC and OTT as the head of content strategy and business alliances

Filmography

References 

Living people
Indian women television producers
Indian television producers
Women television producers
Welham Girls' School alumni
1978 births